Black Mamba is a 1974 horror film directed by George Rowe and starring John Ashley, Marlene Clark, Pilar Pilapil, and Eddie Garcia.

Premise
A doctor gets involved with a woman who practices witchcraft and can turn into a python. She intends for a young child to be her next victim. The doctor tries to stop her.

Cast
John Ashley
Marlene Clark
Pilar Pilapil
Eddie Garcia

Production
The film is notorious for depicting an autopsy performed on a real human corpse. A real corpse was exhumed from one of the local prisons and used on film. "It is a wild film," said Ashley, ""very graphic, very gory."

The film was originally known as Witchcraft. Ashley said it co-starred one of the top female stars in the Philippines and that he made it just before his involvement in Apocalypse Now. He says the film was financed by a Chinese man involved in the advertising business.

Release
Black Mamba was not widely screened.  The film was released in the Philippines but not the US. A person bought it and took it to Hong Kong to redub it but ran out of money.

The film remained unreleased until after Ashley's death in 1997.

References

External links

1974 films
Philippine horror films
Films shot in the Philippines
1970s English-language films